Jai Arjun Singh is a New Delhibased freelance writer and journalist. He has written for Yahoo! India, Business Standard, The Hindu, The Man, Tehelka, Outlook Traveler, The Sunday Guardian and the Hindustan Times, among other publications. His book about the making of the cult comedy film Jaane Bhi Do Yaaro was published by HarperCollins India in 2010. He has also edited The Popcorn Essayists: What Movies Do to Writers, an anthology of original film-related essays for Tranquebar. He writes a popular blog called Jabberwock. He has contributed a story, "Milky Ways", in a book edited by Jaishree Mishra "Of Mothers and Others".

Books 
 Jaane Bhi Do Yaaro: Seriously Funny Since 1983, HarperCollins Publishers (2012) 
 The World of Hrishikesh Mukherjee, Penguin UK (2015) 
Popcorn Essayists, Westland (2011)

References

External links
 NDTV Good Times interview with Jai Arjun Singh
 Jai Arjun Singh's TEDx talk about film literature

Indian male journalists
Living people
Year of birth missing (living people)